SLIM is developed at the Space Telescope European Coordinating Facility (ST-ECF) and is a slitless spectroscopy simulator programme created to produce simulated ACS grism and prism images. It is written in Python programming language and covers all spectral elements available in the Advanced Camera for Surveys (ACS) installed on board the Hubble Space Telescope (HST). It was created to generate data that is both geometrically and photometrically realistic and is appropriate to the slitless spectroscopic modes of the ACS.

External links
ST-ECF page for SLIm

Spaceflight